Howard Elliott (December 6, 1860 – July 8, 1928) was President of Northern Pacific Railway 1903-1913, and also President of New York, New Haven and Hartford Railroad beginning in 1913.

Biography
Elliott was born on December 6, 1860, in New York, and received a degree from Harvard University. He entered railway service during the summer of 1880, during college break as a rodman on the Chicago, Burlington and Quincy Railroad. After graduation from Lawrence Scientific School in 1881 with a degree in civil engineering, he became a clerk in the president's office of the St. Louis, Keokuk and Northwestern Railway. From 1887 to 1891, he was a general freight and passenger agent, and from 1891 to 1896, also of the Hannibal and St. Joseph and Kansas City, St. Joseph and Council Bluffs lines. From 1896 to 1902, he became general manager, and from 1902 to 1903, second vice-president of the Chicago, Burlington and Quincy lines. In 1903 he was elected president of the Northern Pacific Railroad, and also president of various subsidiary companies of the Northern Pacific.

On July 25, 1913 he was elected president and director of the New Haven system, succeeding Charles Sanger Mellen. 

Elliott's term as president of the New Haven began with the wreck of the Bar Harbor Express on September 2, 1913, a disaster of such scope that had not been seen on the New Haven. 

Elliott faced many difficulties throughout his career on the Northern Pacific. The road when he took charge of it was not in very good physical condition. Elliott increased its mileage from 5,111 to 6,032 miles, and its revenue freight train load from 326 to 511 tons. When the Chicago, Milwaukee and St. Paul built its extension to the Puget Sound right through the Northern Pacific territory, cutting severely into competition, Elliott continued with improvements and was able to show a surplus of over $3 million in 1911, and one of over $2 million 1912. When George J. Gould retired as president of the Missouri Pacific in 1911, Elliott was offered the presidency of that road, but declined, preferring to remain in New England.

He died on July 8, 1928.

References 

 Railway Age Gazette (August 1, 1913) pp. 177–8.

External links
 

1860 births
Harvard School of Engineering and Applied Sciences alumni
Northern Pacific Railway people
Businesspeople from New York (state)
1928 deaths